Glenn Cosey (born February 17, 1992) is an American professional basketball player for VEF Rīga of the Latvian Basketball League (LBL).

High school career
Cosey played high school basketball at Carman-Ainsworth High School, in Flint Township, Michigan.

College career 
Cosey played college basketball with Columbus State and Eastern Kentucky after finishing high school at Carman-Ainsworth High School.

Professional career
In February 2018, Cosey won the Polish Basketball Cup with Polskie Cukier Toruń. He scored a game-high 36 points in the final, which Toruń won 88–81 over Stelmet Zielona Góra.

On October 6, 2020, he signed with Bakken Bears of Basketligaen. Cosey averaged 16.2 points, 3.4 rebounds and 7.8 assists per game in five games. 

On December 4, 2020, Cosey signed with Lavrio of the Greek Basket League, which he partially led to the league finals for the first time and a very successful season overall.

On June 30, 2021, he signed with Semt77 Yalovaspor of the Turkish BSL. In nine games, Cosey averaged 10.7 points, 3.7 assists, and 2.6 rebounds per game. 

On November 30, 2021, Cosey signed with Peristeri of the Greek Basket League. In a total of 15 games, he averaged 8.5 points, 1.5 rebounds, 2.7 assists and 0.4 steals, playing around 23 minutes per contest.

On July 20, 2022, he has signed with Zastal Zielona Góra of the Polish Basketball League (PLK).

References

External links
 Glenn Cosey Profile  at draftexpress.com
 Glenn Cosey Profile at espn.go.com
 Glenn Cosey Profile at eurobasket.com
 Glenn Cosey Profile at abaliga.com

Living people
1992 births
ABA League players
ALM Évreux Basket players
American expatriate basketball people in Croatia
American expatriate basketball people in the Czech Republic
American expatriate basketball people in Denmark
American expatriate basketball people in France
American expatriate basketball people in Greece
American expatriate basketball people in Italy
American expatriate basketball people in Latvia
American expatriate basketball people in Poland
American expatriate basketball people in South Korea
American expatriate basketball people in Turkey
American men's basketball players
Basket Zielona Góra players
Basketball players from Flint, Michigan
BK VEF Rīga players
Basketball Nymburk players
Columbus State Cougars men's basketball players
Eastern Kentucky Colonels men's basketball players
KK Krka players
KK Zadar players
Lavrio B.C. players
Peristeri B.C. players
Pertevniyal S.K. players
Point guards
Seoul Samsung Thunders players
Twarde Pierniki Toruń players
Yalovaspor BK players